Heterodactyla is a genus of sea anemones of the family Thalassianthidae. The genus was first described in 1834 by Wilhelm Hemprich and Christian Gottfried Ehrenberg.

Species 
The following species are recognized:

 Heterodactyla hemprichii 
 Heterodactyla hypnoides

References 

Thalassianthidae
Hexacorallia genera
Taxa named by Christian Gottfried Ehrenberg
Taxa named by Wilhelm Hemprich